SP Plus Corporation is the merger of two of the largest US players in the parking management - Standard Parking and Central Parking.  SP+ blends industry-leading technology and best-in-class operations to deliver mobility solutions that enable the efficient movement of people, vehicles and personal belongings. 

The Company is committed to elevating the consumer experience while meeting the objectives of its diverse clients across North America and Europe. Specific services provided include professional parking management, ground transportation, remote baggage check-in and handling, facility maintenance, event logistics, and other technology-driven mobility solutions to aviation, commercial, hospitality, healthcare and government clients.

Company history
Standard Parking began in 1929 in Chicago, Illinois, where it was operated by David and Benjamin Warshauer as a family owned and controlled business. The business operated under the corporate name of Standard Parking Corporation from 1981 until 1995, at which time it was reconstituted as a limited partnership named Standard Parking, L.P. March 1998, Standard Parking merged with APCOA, Inc., forming APCOA/Standard Parking, Inc. 

In April 2003, APCOA/Standard Parking, Inc. changed its corporate name to Standard Parking Corporation.  In June 2004, Standard Parking completed its initial public offering, listing on the Nasdaq under the symbol STAN, and raising $54 million in gross proceeds from the offering.

In July 2009, Standard Parking acquired the assets of Gameday Management Group, which plans the operation of transportation and parking systems, primarily for major stadium and sporting events and whose Click and Park service offers traffic demand management and pre-paid parking services.  

In October 2012, Standard Parking completed the acquisition of Central Parking, effectively doubling the size of the company.

Brand identity change 
In December 2013, the company rebranded to SP Plus Corporation and changed its NASDAQ ticker symbol to SP. 

SP Plus Corporation (Nasdaq:SP) is a provider of parking, baggage handling, ground transportation, facility maintenance, event logistics, and security services.

See also
APCOA Parking

References

COMPANY NEWS; APCOA AND STANDARD PARKING PLAN MERGER, New York Times, 1998.
10 Floors for Parking Planned On Top of a Chicago Church, New York Times, 1990.
IPO Watch: The cost of going public.  Red Herring, 2004.
Standard Parking to merge with Apcoa.
Funding Universe Company History: Holberg Industries, Inc.
Cost of downtown parking 'skyrocketing'.  Chicago Sun Times, 2008.
Parking Heaven , Time Magazine, 2002
Sweet spot won't last; Standard Parking's shares are on a tear, but stock's ascent may begin to idle, 2006
Standard Parking 2009 Annual Report, 2010

Private equity portfolio companies
Parking companies
Companies based in Chicago